Loss of citizenship, also referred to as loss of nationality, is the event of ceasing to be a citizen of a country under the nationality law of that country.

Grounds
Citizenship can be lost in a variety of different ways. In a study of the nationality laws of thirty-three European countries, the European Union Democracy Observatory found nine broadly-defined cases in which a citizen of a country may lose his or her citizenship.

Renunciation 

Citizenship can be lost voluntarily through renunciation. A person might renounce their citizenship in order to take up another citizenship.

Denaturalization 

Citizenship can be lost involuntarily through denaturalization, also known as deprivation or forfeiture. A person might have their citizenship revoked in this way due to:

Fraud in the naturalization process, including sham marriages
Failure to renounce another citizenship after having committed to doing so in a naturalization procedure
Severe legal breaches such as treason

Grounds applying to children 
Children can sometimes lose their citizenship at the same time as their parent doing so, just as they might acquire citizenship at the same time as their parent. Children may also lose their citizenship following adoption by a foreigner or other changes in relation to their parents such as annulment of maternity/paternity.

Other grounds 
Finally, citizenship can be lost through a variety of other grounds, that are often not clearly voluntary or involuntary. One action that is taken voluntarily (e.g. serving in a foreign military) can lead to a subsequent involuntary loss. Some of these grounds include:

Voluntary acquisition of another citizenship
Residing abroad on a permanent basis
Serving in a foreign military or foreign government
Failure to reaffirm one's citizenship by a certain age (often an age between 18 and 30 years old)
Failure to revoke other citizenships by a certain age (e.g. 22 years old in the case of Japan)
Such loss of citizenship may take place without the knowledge of the affected citizen, and indeed without the knowledge of the government. Until the government's officials (e.g. embassy staff) are informed, the government may continue to retain the person's name in its citizenship records.

Limitations
Countries may have legal provisions to prevent the loss of citizenship, particularly where the loss would make the person stateless.

These provisions often stem from international treaties that prevent governments from making people stateless, as well as limiting individual's ability to voluntarily make themselves stateless. Article 7 of the Convention on the Reduction of Statelessness provides that "[l]aws for the renunciation of a nationality shall be conditional upon a person's acquisition or possession of another nationality". However, this is not considered a peremptory norm which binds non-signatories to the Convention.

Countries 
Most countries have provisions that allow for renunciation and denaturalization.

The following countries have provisions for loss of citizenship that go beyond the norm:

 Belgium – Belgian citizens residing abroad between the ages of 18 and 28 can lose citizenship if they meet certain conditions
 Japan – Japanese children born with an additional citizenship lose Japanese citizenship if they fail to give up the other citizenship before the age of 22
 Switzerland – Swiss citizens who have not been registered by the age of 25 lose citizenship

Notes

References

External links
Global Database on Modes of Loss of Citizenship, by the Global Citizenship Observatory (GLOBALCIT), Florence, Italy

Citizenship